Boney James (born James Oppenheim September 1, 1961) is an American saxophonist (tenor, alto and soprano), songwriter, record producer and recording artist.

He is a four-time Grammy Award nominee (Best Pop Instrumental Album, 2001, 2004, 2014 and Best Traditional R&B Performance, 2009) and a Soul Train Award winner (Best Jazz Album 1998). He has also received three NAACP Image Award nominations for Best Jazz Album. James has sold over three million albums, and has accumulated four RIAA Certified Gold Records. In 2009, Billboard magazine named James one of the Top 3 Billboard Contemporary Jazz Artists of the Decade.

Biography 
James took up the clarinet at the age of eight, switching to sax when he was ten having spent his early teen years in New Rochelle, New York.  He became musically influenced by the R&B Motown genre and saxophonist Grover Washington, Jr. When he was fourteen his family moved to Los Angeles, where he joined a fusion band that opened for acts like Flora Purim and the Yellowjackets. Another member of this early band was John Shanks, now a successful pop producer.  James eventually received a degree in History from UCLA, but began playing music full-time after graduation. James learned to play keyboards and in 1985 he joined Morris Day's band. His R&B influence was further strengthened by seven years of touring and sessions as a sideman with Day, the Isley Brothers, Bobby Caldwell, Randy Crawford, Teena Marie and others. It was on the road with Crawford in 1986 that he earned his now-famous moniker, when his physique led a bandmate to joke "We'll have to start calling you Boney James!"

In the early 1990s while on tour with Bobby Caldwell's band he met engineer and producer Paul Brown, beginning a 10-year period of collaboration. 
In 1992 he released his debut album as a leader, Trust, on the independent record label Spindletop Records. Following the record's success, he was signed by the Warner Brothers label in 1994, on which he released the RIAA Certified Gold Records Seduction, Sweet Thing and Body Language albums.

In 2000 he collaborated with trumpeter Rick Braun on an album called Shake it Up. Their duets include the now classic updated version of Hugh Masakela's "Grazin' in the Grass".  Both have appeared regularly on each other's solo albums and the two have toured internationally a number of times.
Other artists to have made guest appearances on Boney's records include Raheem DeVaughn, Faith Evans, George Benson, George Duke, Dwele, Al Jarreau, Philip Bailey, Anthony Hamilton, Jaheim, Eric Benét, Dave Hollister, Stokley Williams, Avery*Sunshine, Kenny Lattimore and Angie Stone.

James began co-producing his records with Brown in 1997, and assumed the role of sole producer starting with his Grammy-nominated Pure album in 2003. Following a string of chart-topping albums, in 2006 James moved to Concord Records and released Shine which posted his highest Billboard Pop Chart positions to that date (No. 44 on the Top 200).  His 2009 album, Send One Your Love earned him a Grammy nomination for Best Traditional R&B Performance.  His 2013 album The Beat  received a Grammy nomination for Best Pop Instrumental Album.

Returning home from a concert performance on May 15, 2010, his car was rear ended by a drunk driver, causing him a fractured jaw, two shattered teeth and facial lacerations which sidelined his career for two months.

In 2014, he produced two songs on Al Jarreau's George Duke tribute album My Old Friend, "No Rhyme No Reason" (feat. Kelly Price) and "Bring Me Joy" (feat. George Duke).

In 2015, he released futuresoul which spent eleven weeks at No. 1 on the Billboard Contemporary Jazz Chart and was the best selling Contemporary Jazz Record of 2015. In August 2015, James made his first appearance on The Tonight Show Starring Jimmy Fallon.

2017 saw the release of Honestly, his sixteenth album (which also featured production from Nutty P Beats) which became his eleventh No. 1 on the Billboard Jazz Albums Chart. It also reached No. 22 on the Billboard Current Albums Chart, his highest pop chart debut to date.

June 2020 he released his seventeenth studio album Solid, describing it as "a reaction to how stressful the world feels these days. Music is a respite, it’s always ‘solid’ and never lets me down." The CD broke his previous Pop Chart record, debuting at #10 on the Billboard Top Albums Chart. His eighteenth album Detour was released on September 23, 2022.

James is married to actress and director Lily Mariye and in 2012 he contributed an original score to her directorial feature film debut, Model Minority.

Discography
 Trust (1992)
 Backbone (1994)
 Seduction (1995)
 Boney's Funky Christmas (1996)
 Sweet Thing (1997)
 Body Language (1999)
 Shake It Up  with Rick Braun (2000)
 Ride (2001)
 Pure (2004)
 Shine (2006)
 Christmas Present (2007)
 Send One Your Love (2009)
 Contact (2011)
 The Beat (2013)
 Futuresoul (2015)
 Honestly (2017)
 Solid (2020)
 Detour (2022)

References

External links

1961 births
Living people
American jazz saxophonists
American male saxophonists
Smooth jazz saxophonists
Concord Records artists
21st-century American saxophonists
21st-century American male musicians
American male jazz musicians